The episodes from the anime Yumeiro Patissiere are based on the manga of the same name written and illustrated by Natsumi Matsumoto. The series is produced by Studio Pierrot and directed by Ko Suzuki. The story is about 14 yr old Ichigo who dreams of becoming a pastry chef. She attends St. Marie Academy in hopes of following her grandmother's footsteps. Along the way, she meets boys, enemies, and sweets spirits.

Two pieces of theme music have been used for the series thus far. The CD single for the two was released by the Columbia Music Entertainment on January 20, 2010 in a regular and limited edition. The limited edition comes with extra charms and costs ¥1,365, but is otherwise the same as the regular edition, which costs ¥1,050. A soundtrack for the series was released on April 21, 2010, entitled .
The opening theme for the second season is "Sweet Romance" by Mayumi Gojo and the ending theme is "HOME MADE HAPPY" by Primavera.

Yumeiro Patissiere was available for streaming with English subtitles on Crunchyroll. This season contains 50 episodes with a second season premiering October 3, 2010 with the name "Yumeiro Patisserie SP Professional."
The first DVD volume for the anime was released March 3, 2010.

Yumeiro Patissiere

Yumeiro Patissiere Professional (season 2)

DVD volumes
The first season is being released in Japan on DVD, with the first of 13 volumes having been released in March 2010. The second season has not yet been released to DVD in Japan.

References

External links
Studio Pierrot's official website 
YTV's official website 
TV Dogatch's official website 

Lists of anime episodes